Krasnoyarskoye is a rural locality (a selo) in Krasnoyarsky Selsoviet, Pospelikhinsky District, Altai Krai, Russia. The population was 790 in 2014. There are 10 streets.

Geography 
Krasnoyarskoye is located 35 km southwest of Pospelikha (the district's administrative centre) by road. Novy Mir is the nearest rural locality.

References 

Rural localities in Pospelikhinsky District